This is a list of international environmental agreements.

Most of the following agreements are legally binding for countries that have formally ratified them. Some, such as the Kyoto Protocol, differentiate between types of countries and each nation's respective responsibilities under the agreement. Several hundred international environmental agreements exist but most link only a limited number of countries. These bilateral or sometimes trilateral agreements are only binding for the countries that have ratified them but are nevertheless essential in the international environmental regime. Including the major conventions listed below, more than 3,000 international environmental instruments have been identified by the IEA Database Project.

Alphabetical order

Aarhus Convention on Access to Information, Public Participation in Decision-making and Access to Justice in Environmental Matters, Aarhus, 1998
Agreement on the Conservation of African-Eurasian Migratory Waterbirds
Alpine Convention together with its nine protocols
Anti-Ballistic Missile Treaty (ABM Treaty) (ABMT)
ASEAN Agreement on Transboundary Haze Pollution
Asia-Pacific Partnership on Clean Development and Climate
Barcelona Convention for Protection against Pollution in the Mediterranean Sea, 1976
Basel Convention on the Control of Transboundary Movements of Hazardous Wastes and their Disposal, Basel, 1989
Biological Weapons Convention (Convention on the Prohibition of the Development, Production and Stockpiling of Bacteriological [Biological] and Toxin Weapons and on their Destruction) (BWC)
Bonn Agreement
Carpathian Convention Framework Convention on the Protection and Sustainable Development of the Carpathians
Cartagena Protocol on Biosafety 2000
Chemical Weapons Convention
China Australia Migratory Bird Agreement
Coastal Marine and Island Biodiversity Conservation Project (Eritrea)
Comprehensive Nuclear-Test-Ban Treaty (CTBT), 1996
Convention for the Conservation of Antarctic Marine Living Resources (CCAMLR), Canberra, 1980
Agreed Measures for the Conservation of Antarctic Fauna and Flora
Convention for the Conservation of Antarctic Marine Living Resources
Convention for the Conservation of Antarctic Seals
Protocol on Environmental Protection to the Antarctic Treaty
Convention for Co-operation in the Protection and Development of the Marine and Coastal Environment of the West and Central African Region, Abidjan, 198
Convention for the Protection and Development of the Marine Environment of the Wider Caribbean Region, Cartagena de Indias, 1983
Convention of the Protection, Management and Development of the Marine and Coastal Environment of the Eastern African Region, Nairobi, 1985
Convention for the Protection of the Marine Environment and Coastal Area of the South-east Pacific, Lima, 1981
Convention for the Protection of the Marine Environment of the North-east Atlantic (OSPAR Convention), Paris, 1992
Convention for the Protection of the Natural Resources and Environment of the South Pacific Region, Nouméa, 1986
Convention on Assistance in the Case of a Nuclear Accident or Radiological Emergency (Assistance Convention), Vienna, 1986
Convention on the Ban of the Import into Africa and the Control of Transboundary Movements and Management of Hazardous Wastes within Africa, Bamako, 1991
Convention on Biological Diversity (CBD), Nairobi, 1992
Convention on Certain Conventional Weapons
Convention on Civil Liability for Damage Caused during Carriage of Dangerous Goods by Road, Rail, and Inland Navigation Vessels (CRTD), Geneva, 1989
Convention on Cluster Munitions
Convention on the Conservation of European Wildlife and Natural Habitats
Convention on the Conservation of Migratory Species of Wild Animals (CMS), Bonn, 1979
Convention on Early Notification of a Nuclear Accident (Notification Convention), Vienna, 1986
Convention on Fishing and Conservation of Living Resources of the High Seas
Convention on the International Trade in Endangered Species of Wild Flora and Fauna (CITES), Washington, DC, 1973
Convention on Long-Range Transboundary Air Pollution
Convention on Nature Protection and Wild Life Preservation in the Western Hemisphere, Washington, DC, 1940
Convention on Nuclear Safety, Vienna, 1994
EMEP Protocol
Heavy Metals Protocol
Multi-effect Protocol (Gothenburg protocol) 
Nitrogen Oxide Protocol
POP Air Pollution Protocol
Sulphur Emissions Reduction Protocols 1985 and 1994
Volatile Organic Compounds Protocol
Convention on the Prevention of Marine Pollution by Dumping Wastes and Other Matter
Convention on the Prohibition of Military or Any Other Hostile Use of Environmental Modification Techniques
Convention on the Protection and Use of Transboundary Watercourses and International Lakes (ECE Water Convention), Helsinki, 1992
Convention on the Protection of the Black Sea against Pollution, Bucharest, 1992
Convention on the Protection of the Marine Environment of the Baltic Sea Area 1992 Helsinki Convention, Helsinki, 1992
Convention on the Transboundary Effects of Industrial Accidents, Helsinki, 1992
Convention on Wetlands of International Importance Especially As Waterfowl Habitat (notably not a Multilateral Environmental Agreement)
Convention to Ban the Importation into Forum Island Countries of Hazardous and Radioactive Wastes and to Control the Transboundary Movement and Management of Hazardous Wastes within the South Pacific Region, Waigani, 1995
Convention to Combat Desertification (CCD), Paris, 1994
Conventions within the UNEP Regional Seas Programme
Directive on the legal protection of biotechnological inventions
Energy Community (Energy Community South East Europe Treaty) (ECSEE)
Espoo Convention Convention on Environmental Impact Assessment in a Transboundary Context, Espoo, 1991
European Agreement Concerning the International Carriage of Dangerous Goods by Inland Waterways (ADN), Geneva, 2000
European Agreement Concerning the International Carriage of Dangerous Goods by Road (ADR), Geneva, 1957
FAO International Code of Conduct on the Distribution and Use of Pesticides, Rome, 1985
FAO International Undertaking on Plant Genetic Resources, Rome, 1983
Framework Convention for the Protection of the Marine Environment of the Caspian Sea
Framework Convention on Climate Change (UNFCCC), New York, 1992
Geneva Protocol (Protocol for the Prohibition of the Use in War of Asphyxiating, Poisonous or other Gases, and of Bacteriological Methods of Warfare)
International Convention for the Conservation of Atlantic Tunas (ICCAT), Rio de Janeiro, 1966
International Convention for the Prevention of Pollution from Ships
International Convention for the Prevention of Pollution of the Sea by Oil, London, 1954, 1962, 1969
International Convention for the Regulation of Whaling (ICRW), Washington, 1946
International Treaty on Plant Genetic Resources for Food and Agriculture
International Tropical Timber Agreement (expired), 1983
International Tropical Timber Agreement (ITTA), Geneva, 1994
Kuwait Regional Convention for Co-operation on the Protection of the Marine Environment from Pollution, Kuwait, 1978
Kyoto Protocol - greenhouse gas emission reductions
Migratory Bird Treaty Act of 1918
Minamata Convention on Mercury, 2013
Montreal Protocol on Substances that Deplete the Ozone Layer, Montreal, 1989
Nagoya Protocol on Access and benefit sharing 2010, Japan
North American Agreement on Environmental Cooperation
Paris Agreement, France, 2015
Protocol on Environmental Protection to the Antarctic Treaty
Putrajaya Declaration of Regional Cooperation for the Sustainable Development of the Seas of East Asia, Malaysia, 2003
Ramsar Convention Convention on Wetlands of International Importance, especially as Waterfowl Habitat, Ramsar, 1971
Regional Convention for the Conservation of the Red Sea and the Gulf of Aden Environment, Jeddah, 1982
Rotterdam Convention on the Prior Informed Consent Procedure for Certain Hazardous Chemicals and Pesticides in International Trade, Rotterdam, 1998
Stockholm Convention Stockholm Convention on Persistent Organic Pollutants Stockholm, 2001
Treaty Banning Nuclear Weapon Tests in the Atmosphere, in Outer Space, and Under Water
United Nations Convention on the Law of the Sea
United Nations Convention to Combat Desertification
United Nations Framework Convention on Climate Change
Vienna Convention for the Protection of the Ozone Layer, Vienna, 1985, including the Montreal Protocol on Substances that Deplete the Ozone Layer, Montreal, 1987
Vienna Convention on Civil Liability for Nuclear Damage, Vienna, 1963
Western Regional Climate Action Initiative
Working Environment (Air Pollution, Noise and Vibration) Convention, 1977

Topic order

General 

Aarhus Convention Convention on Access to Information, Public Participation in Decision-making and Access to Justice in Environmental Matters, Aarhus, 1998
Espoo Convention Convention on Environmental Impact Assessment in a Transboundary Context, Espoo, 1991

Atmosphere

Convention on Long-Range Transboundary Air Pollution (LRTAP), Geneva, 1979
Environmental Protection: Aircraft Engine Emissions, Annex 16, vol. 2 to the Chicago Convention on International Civil Aviation, Montreal, 1981
Framework Convention on Climate Change (UNFCCC), New York, 1992, including the Kyoto Protocol, 1997, and the Paris Agreement, 2015
 Georgia Basin-Puget Sound International Airshed Strategy, Vancouver, Statement of Intent, 2002
U.S.-Canada Air Quality Agreement (bilateral U.S.-Canadian agreement on acid rain), 1986
Vienna Convention for the Protection of the Ozone Layer, Vienna, 1985, including the Montreal Protocol on Substances that Deplete the Ozone Layer, Montreal, 1987

Freshwater resources
Convention on the Protection and Use of Transboundary Watercourses and International Lakes (ECE Water Convention), Helsinki, 1992

Hazardous substances

Convention on Civil Liability for Damage Caused during Carriage of Dangerous Goods by Road, Rail, and Inland Navigation Vessels (CRTD), Geneva, 1989
Convention on the Control of Transboundary Movements of Hazardous Wastes and their Disposal, Basel, 1989
Convention on the Ban of the Import into Africa and the Control of Transboundary Movements and Management of Hazardous Wastes Within Africa, Bamako, 1991
Convention on the Prior Informed Consent Procedure for Certain Hazardous Chemicals and Pesticides in International Trade, Rotterdam, 1998
Convention on the Transboundary Effects of Industrial Accidents, Helsinki, 1992
European Agreement Concerning the International Carriage of Dangerous Goods by Inland Waterways (AND), Geneva, 2000
European Agreement Concerning the International Carriage of Dangerous Goods by Road (ADR), Geneva, 1957
FAO International Code of Conduct on the Distribution and Use of Pesticides, Rome, 1985
Minamata Convention on Mercury, Minamata, 2013
Stockholm Convention Stockholm Convention on Persistent Organic Pollutants Stockholm, 2001
Convention to Ban the Importation into Forum Island Countries of Hazardous and Radioactive Wastes and to Control the Transboundary Movement and Management of Hazardous Wastes within the South Pacific Region, Waigani, 1995

Marine environment – global conventions
Convention on the Prevention of Marine Pollution by Dumping of Wastes and Other Matter (London Convention), London, 1972
International Convention for the Prevention of Pollution from Ships, 1973, as modified by the Protocol of 1978 relating thereto (MARPOL 73/78), London, 1973 and 1978
International Convention for the Prevention of Pollution of the Sea by Oil, London, 1954, 1962 and 1969
International Convention on Civil Liability for Oil Pollution Damage (CLC), Brussels, 1969, 1976,1984 and 1992
International Convention on the Establishment of an International Fund for Compensation for Oil Pollution Damage(FUND)1971 and 1992, Brussels, 1971/1992
International Convention on Liability and Compensation for Damage in Connection with the Carriage of Hazardous and Noxious Substances by Sea (HNS), London, 1996
International Convention on Oil Pollution Preparedness, Response and Co-operation (OPRC), London, 1990
International Convention Relating to Intervention on the High Seas in Cases of Oil Pollution Casualties Intervention Convention, Brussels, 1969
Protocol on Preparedness, Response and Co-operation to Pollution Incidents by Hazardous and Noxious Substances OPRC-HNS Protocol, London, 2000
United Nations Convention on the Law of the Sea LOS Convention, Montego Bay, 1982

Marine environment – regional conventions
Convention for Co-operation in the Protection and Development of the Marine and Coastal Environment of the West and Central African Region, Abidjan, 1981
Convention for the Protection and Development of the Marine Environment and Coastal Region of the Mediterranean Sea Barcelona Convention, Barcelona, 1976
Convention for the Protection and Development of the Marine Environment of the Wider Caribbean Region, Cartagena de Indias, 1983
Convention for the Protection, Management and Development of the Marine and Coastal Environment of the Eastern African Region (Nairobi Convention), Nairobi, 1985
Convention for the Protection of the Marine Environment and Coastal Area of the South-east Pacific, Lima, 1981
Convention for the Protection of the Marine Environment of the North-east Atlantic OSPAR Convention, Paris, 1992
Convention for the Protection of the Natural Resources and Environment of the South Pacific Region, Nouméa, 1986
Convention on the Protection of the Black Sea against Pollution, Bucharest, 1992
Convention on the Protection of the Marine Environment of the Baltic Sea Area Helsinki Convention (HELCOM), Helsinki, 1974, 1992
Conventions within the UNEP Regional Seas Programme
Framework Convention for the Protection of the Marine Environment of the Caspian Sea
Kuwait Regional Convention for Co-operation on the Protection of the Marine Environment from Pollution, Kuwait, 1978
Regional Convention for the Conservation of the Red Sea and the Gulf of Aden Environment, Jeddah, 1982

Marine living resources

Agreement on the Conservation of Albatrosses and Petrels
Agreement on the Conservation of Cetaceans in the Black Sea, Mediterranean Sea and contiguous Atlantic area (ACCOBAMS), Monaco, 1996
Agreement on the Conservation of Small Cetaceans of the Baltic, North East Atlantic, Irish and North Seas (ASCOBANS), New York, 1992
Convention for the Conservation of Antarctic Marine Living Resources (CCAMLR), Canberra, 1980
Agreed Measures for the Conservation of Antarctic Fauna and Flora
Convention for the Conservation of Antarctic Marine Living Resources
Convention for the Conservation of Antarctic Seals
Protocol on Environmental Protection to the Antarctic Treaty
Convention on the Conservation of Migratory Species of Wild Animals (CMS), Bonn, 1979
International Convention for the Conservation of Atlantic Tunas (ICCAT), Rio de Janeiro, 1966
International Convention for the Regulation of Whaling (ICRW), Washington, 1946

Nature conservation and terrestrial living resources
Antarctic Treaty, Washington, DC, 1959
Amazon Cooperation Treaty, Brasilia, 1978
Convention on Biological Diversity (CBD), Nairobi, 1992
Convention on the Conservation of Migratory Species of Wild Animals (CMS), Bonn, 1979
Convention on the International Trade in Endangered Species of Wild Flora and Fauna (CITES), Washington, DC, 1973
Organization of American States Convention on Nature Protection and Wild Life Preservation in the Western Hemisphere, Washington, DC, 1940
United Nations Convention to Combat Desertification (UNCCD), Paris, 1994
Food and Agriculture Organization International Undertaking on Plant Genetic Resources, Rome, 1983
the 1983 "voluntary undertaking" was updated and strengthened as the International Treaty on Plant Genetic Resources for Food and Agriculture, Madrid, 2001
International Tropical Timber Agreement (ITTA), Geneva, 1994
Memorandum of Understanding on the Conservation of Migratory Birds of Prey in Africa and Eurasia (Raptors MoU)
Ramsar Convention on Wetlands of International Importance Especially as Waterfowl Habitat ( the Convention on Wetlands), Ramsar, 1971
UNESCO Convention Concerning the Protection of the World Cultural and Natural Heritage ( the World Heritage Convention), Paris, 1972

Noise pollution

Working Environment (Air Pollution, Noise and Vibration) Convention, 1977

Nuclear safety
Comprehensive Nuclear-Test-Ban Treaty, 1996
Convention on Assistance in the Case of a Nuclear Accident or Radiological Emergency (Assistance Convention), Vienna, 1986
Convention on Early Notification of a Nuclear Accident (Notification Convention), Vienna, 1986
Convention on Nuclear Safety, Vienna, 1994
Treaty Banning Nuclear Weapon Tests in the Atmosphere, in Outer Space, and Under Water
Vienna Convention on Civil Liability for Nuclear Damage, Vienna, 1963

See also 

 Action for Climate Empowerment
 Arms control
 Earth Negotiations Bulletin
 Environmental law
 Environmental organizations
 Environmental tariff
 International Network for Environmental Compliance and Enforcement
 List of climate change initiatives
 List of environmental laws by country
 List of environmental lawsuits
 List of international animal welfare conventions
 List of supranational environmental agencies
 List of treaties
 Wildlife Enforcement Monitoring System

References

External links 
 Relationship between MEAs and the World Trade Organization
 Mitchell's Databaseproject on IEAs (archived 18 August 2011)
ECOLEX-the gateway to environmental law

List
International relations lists
Environmental